HMS Hasty was a  which served with the Royal Navy. She was launched by Yarrow Shipbuilders in 1894, served in home waters and was sold off in 1912.

Construction and design
On 12 October 1893, the British Admiralty placed an order for three torpedo boat destroyers (and Hasty) with the shipbuilder Yarrow under the 1893–1894 shipbuilding programme for the Royal Navy as a follow-on to the two prototype destroyers ( and ) ordered from Yarrows under the 1892–1893 programme.

As a torpedo boat, the planned armament was a single QF 12 pounder 12 cwt ( calibre) gun on a platform on the ship's conning tower (in practice the platform was also used as the ship's bridge), together with a secondary gun armament of three 6-pounder guns, and two 18 inch (450 mm) torpedo tubes. As a gunboat, one of the torpedo tubes could be removed to accommodate a further two six-pounders.

Displacement was  light and  full load. Two funnels were fitted.

Hasty was laid down at Yarrow's Poplar, London shipyard in December 1893 as Yard number 993 and was launched on 16 June 1894. She reached a speed of  during sea trials. She was completed in May 1896, at a cost of £41,141. Locomotive boilers were being made obsolete by water-tube boilers by the time of her completion, and she was refitted at Earle's Shipbuilding in 1899–1890 with water-tube boilers changing to a three-funneled configuration.

Service history
In 1896 Hasty was in reserve at Portsmouth. Hasty took part in the fleet review held at Spithead on 16 August 1902 for the coronation of King Edward VII. In December 1902 she was moved from Portsmouth to Devonport.

Hasty was sold to Cox for scrapping at their Falmouth yard on 9 July 1912.

Notes

Bibliography
 

 

Charger-class destroyers
Ships built in Poplar
1894 ships
A-class destroyers (1913)